Thomas Wylie (born 10 November 1907, date of death unknown) was a Scottish professional footballer who played as a forward in the English Football League for Sunderland, and in the Scottish Football League for Motherwell and Queen of the South.

References

1907 births
Year of death missing
Footballers from Renfrewshire
Scottish footballers
Association football forwards
Benburb F.C. players
Motherwell F.C. players
Sunderland A.F.C. players
Queen of the South F.C. players
Peebles Rovers F.C. players
Scottish Football League players
Scottish Junior Football Association players
English Football League players